Stardust the Super Wizard is a fictional superhero from the Golden Age of Comics who originally appeared in American comic books published by Fox Feature Syndicate. The character was created by writer-artist Fletcher Hanks. Stardust the Super Wizard made his first appearance in Fantastic Comics #1 (December 1939).

Publication history

Golden Age stories
Stardust the Super Wizard was featured in 16 issues of Fantastic Comics (December 1939–March 1941) and Big 3 #2 (January 1941). All features, with exceptions of Fantastic Comics #6 and #9, were both written and illustrated by Fletcher Hanks.

According to Jess Nevins' Encyclopedia of Golden Age Superheroes, Stardust's foes include "ordinary criminals, the Brain-Men of Mars, the Super Fiend, Skullface Kurd, and Yew Bee and his Fifth Column".

Reprints and collections
Stardust stories were reprinted in: 
 Raw #5 (March 1983) 
 Crack #2 (April 1984)
 Men of Mystery Comics (2001, 2005, 2007, 2015)
 Golden Age Greats Spotlight, vol. 3 (May 2008)
 Stardust the Super Wizard comics/RPG (September 2016)

Gwandanaland Comics issued the complete collection of Stardust stories from the Golden Age of Comics in Gwandanaland Comics #9: Stardust the Super Wizard (September 2016).

The complete works of Fletcher Hanks have been collected in the Fantagraphics Books: 
 I Shall Destroy All Civilized Planets! (2007)
 You Shall Die by Your Own Evil Creation! (2009) 
 Turn Loose Our Death Rays and Kill Them All! (2016)
The last volume is a combination of the first two with additional material. The complete collection catalogs all 15 of Fletcher Hanks' classic Stardust stories. In 2008, editor Paul Karasik received an Eisner Award for "Best Archival Collection/Project: Comic Books" for his work on I Shall Destroy All Civilized Planets! In 2009, Fantagraphics started to include a Fletcher Hanks mini-comic coloring book titled Color Me or Die!, featuring a cover by Charles Burns, to people who ordered volumes of The Complete Fletcher Hanks.

Index

Fictional character biography
Stardust, whose vast knowledge of interplanetary science has made him the most remarkable man that ever lived, devotes his abilities to crime-busting. In later episodes, he changes his focus to racket-busting. In his Golden Age adventures, Stardust patrolled the entire occupied Solar System. The stories, however, focused primarily on his dealings with the planet Earth. Nothing is known of Stardust's past.

Stardust stories followed a tried-and-true formula. The Super Wizard would use his omniscient powers to eavesdrop on criminals plotting a crime. The main villain would describe his grandiose plan (e.g. to commit genocide, lay waste to a city, destroy democracy, etc.). Stardust would pontificate on how evil the villain's plans were but did nothing to prevent them. The villain would then put his plan into action, and many people were either killed or forced to flee. When Stardust arrived on the scene, he would verbally berate the villains and then set into motion a series of increasingly bizarre and violent acts of revenge against the evildoers, often turning their own schemes against them. When the dust cleared, the citizenry would often bemoan the fact that they were unable to thank their hero who had already flown back to his secret headquarters in the stars.

Further adventures
The character of Stardust the Super Wizard is in the public domain.  As such, he can and has been used by a host of creators over the years.

New Stardust stories offer individual interpretations and explorations of the original character. These stories attempt to fill in plot holes, propose backstory, and otherwise embellish a seminal character in comics history.

Publishers of tabletop role-playing games have created campaigns featuring Stardust the Super Wizard, allowing players to interact, collaborate, and write their own stories.

Powers and abilities

Skills
Stardust is a master of space and planetary forces, possessing a vast knowledge of interplanetary science. He is also a skilled detective specializing in data collection. Although Stardust has never exhibited any formal combat training, his physical size and strength make him a formidable brawler.

Physicality
Physically, Stardust appears as a clean-cut, blond-haired, blue-eyed, white human male of heroic proportions. His height has been estimated anywhere between 7'3" and 9'9" tall. His genealogy has never been revealed. Although he has vested interests in Earth, it is unclear if he is of Earthly origin.

Stardust has exhibited a number of powers that are not attributed to his mastery of space and planetary forces. These powers may be attributed to an alien physiognomy, cybernetic augmentation, genetic modification, tetralogical manipulation, or a combination of these factors. The unexplained powers of Stardust include: 
 Superhuman strength. He has lifted grown men off the ground one-handed and tossed them out a window with little effort.
 Superhuman speed and accelerated perception. Stardust once delivered a well-timed uppercut while traveling at 300,000 miles per minute (18 million miles an hour).
 Superhuman endurance. Stardust has never been known to tire—or sleep for that matter.
 Superhuman durability. Stardust is immune to extreme heat and cold due to exposure to gas emitted from a star.
 Extrasensory perception. Stardust has been able to sense danger and perceive events over great distances.
 Artificial lungs. Stardust's respiratory system has been augmented, enabling him to breathe safely under any condition.

Star-metal Suit
Stardust wears a flexible sky-blue unitard made of star-metal that fits him like a second skin. It is controlled through rays from a distant sun, rendering him invulnerable to chemicals and indestructible by electrical or violent force. Stardust has worn mid-calf boots in both blue and red.

Radiation belt
Stardust wears a corset-sized gold radiation belt (aka ray belt) around his midsection. The belt is in a starburst motif and features two rows of red studs. The radiation belt empowers Stardust with a wide array of beams, rays, and arcs. Each ray is represented by its own red stud. Energies from the belt can be used at a local level to affect individual persons or expanded to levels that affect the movement of planetary bodies. The radiation belt does not need to be charged and is not dependent on an outside energy source. It has never overloaded or shown even minor stress despite the great demands that have been made of it. Stardust appears to be limited merely by the breadth of his scientific knowledge and his ability to make good choices.

Thought-recording collar
Stardust wears a thought-recording collar that reproduces his internal monologue. The recordings are transmitted via thought-recording rays in order to establish telepathic communication with individuals or groups of people. The collar is gold colored and designed in starburst motif. It features a row of red studs similar to the ones found on Stardust's radiation belt.

Tubular spacial
The tubular spacial is a luminous forcefield that enables Stardust to travel on accelerated super-solar light waves at tremendous speeds. Stardust has been recorded at speeds of up to 300,000 miles a minute (18 million miles an hour). When pushed to its utmost, the tubular spacial leaves a trail of friction-fire in its wake. It is Stardust's primary mode of interplanetary transportation. He is able to control the speed and direction of the tubular spacial at will. The field is impenetrable and virtually indestructible. The tubular spacial generates a null field that neutralized all forms of energy (kinetic, electrical, magnetic, gamma, gravitational, etc.) and also protects him from the crushing forces of acceleration. The tubular spacial preserves and protects him from the vacuum of space. Stardust can use the field for his own use, extend it to accommodate a passenger, or expand it further to encompass a large group of people.

The tubular spacial can discharge a cloud of acid-proof dust that acts as chaff and a radar countermeasure. Stardust can expand the wake of the tubular spacial and generate luminous skywriting.

Stardust flash
Stardust's trademark flash grants him the power of teleportation, allowing near instantaneous transportation between two fixed points. A brilliant flash shaped like a 5-pointed star accompanies each transfer. The flash can range in size from 10 feet wide to thousands of miles in diameter. There does not seem to be a limit to the distance over which an object can be flashed. However, Stardust has never used his flash outside of a planet's gravity well. His flash can teleport individual objects, people, groups, and even entire facilities. The flash can be further calibrated to target specific individuals, as when Stardust transported the entire staff of the F.B.I. from their offices and left all their office furniture behind. Objects can also be safely transferred into occupied space, as when Stardust instantly outfitted the Sixth Columnists with uniforms. Furthermore, the flash recalibrates and redirects the momentum of the object it transfers. This allows an object to match the relative velocity of its destination. Stardust was able to safely flash the President from a moving plane to the stationary White House in Washington D.C.

Stardust's flash is also capable of affecting the momentum and vector of objects in its immediate vicinity. The flash is capable of affecting local objects, but can be expanded to a planetary scale. Stardust uses his flash to launch his tubular spacial. He also uses the flash at the end of his flight to remove momentum—allowing him to calmly walk out of his star. Stardust routinely uses his flash to enter buildings. If he enters a building after a long interplanetary flight, the building will shake just before he appears. Stardust typically announces his arrival before he appears.

Stardust's astral observatory
Stardust's headquarters is a crime-detecting laboratory and observation post that is located on what is referred to in early stories as a "private asteroid" and in later stories as his "private star". Stardust's private star has a breathable atmosphere capable of sustaining human and plant life. It features rolling hills, a lush forest, and paved roads. Stardust lives in a massive castle which is a short walk from the observatory. The star has enough mass to sustain a number of small satellites. From his marvelously equipped observatory, Stardust stays apprised of the affairs of the planets. Equipment Stardust has utilized in the Astral Observatory, broken down into categories, include:

Crime detection
 Crime detector. A delicate crime-detecting unit with a needle gauge that vibrates to alert Stardust when a crime has been planned and is about to be executed.
 Crime-detecting scopes. Various devices that indicate the nature, location, extent, and severity of a crime.

Criminal investigation
 Long-range televisional finder - a scanner equipped with a widescreen monitor and a thought recorder that tunes into the thoughts of criminals to reveal their whereabouts and current plans to Stardust.
 Panoramic concentration unit reveals the power and influence of an organization and the extent of the crime being perpetrated, allowing Stardust to see the big picture.

Remote observation
 Dictaphonic view plates. A square monitor that allows Stardust to observe and record criminals from afar.
 Televisional crime-detecting unit. A circular monitor that allows Stardust to remotely observe criminals.
 Interplanetary television set and thought-process unit. A widescreen monitor and speaker system that allows Stardust to remotely observe and translate the thoughts of criminals. One can assume this comes in handy when the criminals are from another planet and speak a different language.
 Super-interplanetary television set. A wall-mounted super-widescreen monitor equipped with an adjustable thought recorder that allows Stardust to observe criminals from afar.
 Crime-detecting ray-phone. A headset with earphones and a view plate that allows Stardust to view criminals from afar.

Mobile Technology
 Anti-cosmic relayer. A device that reduces the radio frequency of remote controlled missiles and redirect them.
 Concentrator. A handheld wand that draws the heat rays of the Sun and concentrates them into a beam hot enough to melt an entire fortress.
 Panoramic television unit. A tablet-size device that allows Stardust to remotely view multiple sites. Used to observe the actions of the Sixth Column across the world.
 Simplified television unit. A handheld television unit, the size and shape of a smart phone, that allows Stardust to observe criminal activity from afar.
 Super radiophonic sets. Telecommunication devices used by the Sixth Column to contact with Stardust.
 Universal sound plate. A tablet-sized communication device that establishes an audio tele-conference with the operators of his super radiophonic sets.

Reception
In American Comic Book Chronicles: 1940-1944, comics historian Kurt Mitchell writes that the Stardust stories "highlighted Hanks' straitfaced absurdity and distinctively ugly dramatis personae. In style and attitude, Hanks anticipated the underground comics of the 1960s and early '70s".

Further reading

Articles
 "Now You'll Pay the Penalty: The Wonderfully Weird Work of Fletcher Hanks" by Adrianna Gober (May 2017)
 "10 Reasons Why Fletcher Hanks Kicks Ass" by Paul Karasik (January 2017)
 "Fletcher Hanks:  The Most Bonkers Comic Book Creator of All-Time" by Mark Peters (January 2017)
 "The Astonishingly Incompetent Superhero Art of Fletcher Hanks" by Martin Schneider (December 2014)
 "The Golden Age, Part Two: Fletcher Hanks and Stardust the Super Wizard" by Adrianna Gober (September 2014)
 "The Eerie Art of Fletcher Hanks" by Ari Samsky
 "Fletcher Hanks: Artist and Brute" by Kris Jacobs
 "Fletcher Hanks Destroys New York!" by Christopher Irving
 "You Are Now in the Power of Stardust" by Gordon Monday
 "Interview: Paul Karasik Deconstructs Fletcher Hanks Revamp" by Van Jensen
 "Fletcher Hanks, Forgotten Genius?" by Harry Mendryk
 "Comic-Con 2007: Fletcher Hanks, the Batshit Genius of Golden Age Comics" by Eric David Even

Histories
Stardust the Super Wizard is featured or referenced in the following books on comic book history:
 Men of Tomorrow: Geeks, Gangsters, and the Birth of the Comic Book by Gerald Jones (2004)
 Art Out of Time: Unknown Comics Visionaries, 1900-1969 by Dan Nadel (2006)
 Supermen! The First Wave of Comic Book Heroes 1936-1941 by Greg Sadowski (2009)
 Graven Images: Religion in Comic Books & Graphic Novels edited by A. David Lewis and Christine Hoff Kraemer (2010)
 Comics, Manga, and Graphic Novels: A History of Graphic Narratives by Robert Petersen (2010)
 Comics Versus Art by Bart Beaty (2012)
 The League of Regrettable Superheroes: Half-Baked Heroes from Comic Book History by Jon Morris (2015)
 Amazing Heroes Handbook by Christopher Irving (2015)

Footnotes

Sources
 The Digital Comic Museum
 Turn Loose Our Death Rays And Kill Them All! The Complete Works Of Fletcher Hanks

1939 comics debuts
1941 comics endings
Male characters in comics
Fox Feature Syndicate superheroes
Golden Age superheroes
Comics characters introduced in 1939
Comics characters who can move at superhuman speeds
Comics characters who can teleport
Comics characters who use magic
Comics characters with superhuman strength
Superhero comics
Fictional wizards
Tapastic webcomics
Webtoons